Mostra  is an underground metro station that serve Line 6 on the Naples Metro. It was opened on 4 February 2007 as part of the inaugural section of Line 6 between Mergellina and Mostra.

The station, even though it is terminal, presents binary loops that end in the temporary storage of trains of Line 6, waiting for work to finish in the new one, which is why the two tracks are through. Since then show trains exclusively in the direction Mergellina.
Located in the district of Fuorigrotta, the station is located near the Stadio San Paolo and some university faculties: in spite of all passenger movements is not as high as the other metro lines.
Mostra is part of Art Stations with works by Merz, Sironi and Pisani.

The previous station is Augusto.

References

See also
Railway stations in Italy
List of Naples metro stations

Naples Metro stations
2007 establishments in Italy
Railway stations opened in 2007
Railway stations in Italy opened in the 21st century